An Atlantic–Pacific crossover hurricane is a tropical cyclone that develops in the Atlantic Ocean and moves into the Pacific Ocean, or vice versa. Since reliable records began in 1851, a total of twenty crossover tropical cyclones have been recorded. It is more common for the remnants of a North Atlantic hurricane to redevelop into a different storm in the Pacific; in such a scenario, they are not considered the same system.

Storms
''Note: Information is mostly provided by the Atlantic best track.

Listed in chronological order

Other storms
There have also been numerous tropical cyclones that formed in one basin, dissipated, and re-developed in the other, which are not considered an Atlantic-Pacific crossover hurricane by the NHC. In chronological order from earliest to most recent, they are:
The remnants of Hurricane Janet in 1955 later led to the formation of an unnamed tropical storm in the East Pacific on October 1; the newly generated tropical cyclone later brought rains to the southwestern United States.
In 1960, Hurricane Abby made landfall over Belize, then known as British Honduras, and dissipated a day later while situated over the Mexican state of Tabasco. Its remnants crossed over Mexico into the Pacific Ocean and regenerated into Hurricane Celeste on July 20.
In 1969, Hurricane Francelia hit southern Belize, then known as British Honduras, weakening quickly over land and dissipating over Guatemala. The system continued slowly across Central America, crossing into the eastern Pacific Ocean three days after it moved ashore. Its remnants eventually redeveloped into Tropical Storm Glenda off the coast of Mexico.
Tropical Storm Chloe in 1971 made landfall in the Yucatán Peninsula and dissipated soon after. Its remnants continued into the Eastern Pacific and developed into Hurricane Lily, which made landfall in southwest Mexico.
Also in 1971, Tropical Storm Laura made landfall in Belize and dissipated in Guatemala. Its remnants continued into the Eastern Pacific and developed into Tropical Storm Sharon.
In 1978, Tropical Storm Bess went southward, affecting Mexico. Its remnants crossed into the Pacific Ocean, where it regenerated into Hurricane Iva.
Later in 1978, Hurricane Cora's remnants crossed over Central America into the Pacific Ocean, where it reintensified, becoming Hurricane Kristy.
In 1988, Tropical Depression Six degenerated into a tropical wave near the island of Jamaica on August 23. A day later it moved over Central America with minimal convection and redeveloped into Hurricane Kristy once it reached the eastern Pacific.
Later on that same year, Tropical Storm Isaac completely dissipated on October 1 near Windward Islands. Its remnants moved northwestward and crossed into in the eastern Pacific Ocean basin, where it eventually regenerated  as Tropical Depression Twenty-E days later.
Hurricane Cosme in 1989 crossed from the Pacific, and its low-level circulation dissipated over northern Mexico. Its remnants merged with another tropical wave and contributed to the development of Tropical Storm Allison in the Atlantic.
Operationally, it was considered that Tropical Storm Bret, from 1993, retained its circulation and was designated Tropical Depression Eight-E upon reaching the Pacific, later becoming Hurricane Greg, but post-storm analysis determined that Bret actually dissipated over western Nicaragua, with Greg forming from its remnants several days later.
Tropical Depression Nine in 2001 made landfall in Nicaragua and degenerated into a tropical wave. The wave later regenerated into a tropical depression that became Hurricane Juliette.
Hurricane Iris's remnants, of 2001, in the Atlantic Ocean triggered the formation of Tropical Storm Manuel in the Pacific.
Tropical Storm Earl in 2004 dissipated in the southeast Caribbean Sea, but its remnants regenerated into Hurricane Frank in the East Pacific.
The low-level circulation center of the storm soon dissipated. It is not considered as crossover storm, as the original low-level circulation center had dissipated, and since the system also merged with another tropical wave prior to regeneration.
Hurricane Ernesto of 2012 developed near the Lesser Antilles. The system weakened to a low-pressure area in Mexico, and its remnants moved into the eastern Pacific and developed into Tropical Storm Hector.
Hurricane Barbara of 2013 made landfall in southwest Mexico and dissipated before reaching the Gulf of Mexico. The remnants of Barbara and a cyclonic gyre led to the formation of a broad area of low pressure, which later became Tropical Storm Andrea over the central Gulf of Mexico.
Tropical Storm Trudy of 2014 formed in the eastern Pacific and made landfall in southern Mexico, its remnants emerged into the Bay of Campeche and subsequently developed into Tropical Storm Hanna in the Atlantic.
The remnant moisture from Hurricane Earl of 2016 interacted with a disturbance on the Pacific coast of Mexico, which contributed to the formation of Tropical Storm Javier in the eastern Pacific. 
The remnants of Tropical Storm Bret of 2017 traversed over Central America and emerged into the eastern Pacific, which led to the formation of Hurricane Dora.
Also in 2017, Hurricane Franklin made landfall in the Mexican state of Veracruz; its remnants moved across Mexico during the following day and emerged into the eastern Pacific, later developing into Tropical Storm Jova.
Later that year, Hurricane Katia made landfall in Mexico and was then downgraded to a remnant low; its remnants crossed into the Pacific Ocean, where it regenerated into Hurricane Otis.
Tropical Storm Amanda of 2020 made landfall in southeastern Guatemala, rapidly weakened, and the storm's low-level circulation center dissipated. However, its remnant low-pressure area continued northward and eventually regenerated into Tropical Storm Cristobal in the Bay of Campeche.
Hurricane Nana of 2020 made landfall in Belize, weakened, and the storm's low-level circulation center dissipated over Guatemala. After its mid-level circulation emerged into the Pacific, contrary to expectations, it developed a new surface low and regenerated into Tropical Storm Julio.
Hurricane Grace in 2021 made landfall in Mexico as a strong Category 3 hurricane, and the system's low-level circulation center soon dissipated. Its mid-level remnants emerged into the Eastern Pacific and redeveloped into Tropical Storm Marty.
Hurricane Agatha of 2022 made landfall in Oaxaca then degenerated into a remnant low which dissipated inland, near the northern coast of the Isthmus of Tehuantepec. The remnant low was absorbed into the disorganized disturbance complex that eventually became Tropical Storm Alex.

Naming conventions

Prior to 2000, storms were renamed after crossing from the Atlantic into the Eastern Pacific. At the 22nd hurricane committee in 2000 it was decided that tropical cyclones that moved from the Atlantic to the Eastern Pacific basin and vice versa would no longer be renamed. Hurricane Otto in 2016 was the first storm to cross from one basin to another to apply under this rule.

See also

 List of tropical cyclones
 List of Pacific hurricanes
 Atlantic hurricane season

References

Atlantic
Pacific
Lists of tropical cyclones by area